Dichomeris consertellus is a moth in the family Gelechiidae. It was described by Hugo Theodor Christoph in 1882. It is found in south-eastern Siberia and Japan.

The length of the forewings is about 5 mm. The forewings are yellowish brown with black marks. The hindwings are dark grey.

The larvae feed on Corylus heterophylla.

References

Moths described in 1882
consertellus